Timothy Williams (born 14 February 1966) is an English/Canadian composer, conductor, and orchestrator known for his film, television, and video game scores. A graduate of the National Film and Television School, Williams has won numerous awards and is best known for his work on the A24 film Pearl, Finding You, Brightburn, Get Out, Guardians of the Galaxy, Guardians of the Galaxy Vol. 2, Deadpool 2 and Robert Duvall's Wild Horses. He is a frequent collaborator of musician and composer Tyler Bates, Robert Duncan and Benjamin Wallfisch.

Early life and education
Williams went to St. Michaels University School in Victoria, Canada, at the same time as Leslie Hope, Andrew Sabiston, Kenneth Oppel, and Bert Archer. He then attended the National Film and Television School in England and furthered his studies at UCLA Extension and the ASCAP Film Scoring Workshop.

Career

Theatre 
Williams wrote the musical Napoleon, which opened in 1994 at the Elgin Theatre in Toronto. It was nominated for a Dora Award for Best New Musical. EMI released a Highlights Album on their Angel Broadway label. In 1996, he relocated to England and worked with Directors Gale Edwards and Francesca Zambello to rework Napoleon until its opening at the Shaftesbury Theatre in London's West End Theatre District in 2000. Napoleon did a run at NYMF in 2015, which was a reimagining of the original show with an entirely new book and many new songs.

In July 2017, a lavish new production Napoleon opened at the Charlotte Theater in Seoul for a limited three-month. It quickly became the number one selling ticket of the summer. It feature a cast of 54 including B.A.P's Daehyun and BTOB's Changsub alongside famous musical actors such as Lim Tae Kyung, Michael Lee, and Han Ji Sang. It was directed by Richard Ouzounian and features all new sets, costumes, projections, orchestrations and was translated into Korean. It received glowing reviews. It is repped in Asia by Broadway Asia. In August 2022, Napoleon was translated into Dutch and performed in Holland. In September 2022 Napoleon was translated into French and a large scale tribe concert was performed in Seoul, Korea.

Film 
Williams has scored numerous award-winning feature films including A24's Pearl, Finding You, Brightburn, Wild Horses, written, directed and starring Robert Duvall, Josh Hartnett and James Franco; "We Summon The Darkness", Disney Jr.'s "Piney The Lonesome Pine", starring Jonathan Pryce and Simon Pegg, Walking with the Enemy, starring Ben Kingsley, the score for which was on the eligible list for the 2015 Academy Awards, and won Best Picture at FLIFF, I.T. directed by John Moore starring Pierce Brosnan, I'm Not Ashamed, directed by Brian Baugh, nominated for Best picture at the 2017 Dove Awards, Diablo, starring Scott Eastwood and Walton Goggins which won Best Picture at the San Diego film festival,  The Butterfly Circus which won over 35 Best Picture awards, the Tom Hanks produced WWII documentary Beyond All Boundaries, Red Sky for which Tim Williams was nominated Best Composer and Music Editor by Motion Picture Sound Editors.

He has received numerous awards including two Motion Picture SE Golden Reel Award nominations, four Thea Award wins, 10 ASCAP Plus Awards and best score at the 24FPS Festival for "Butterfly Circus".

Recent films include Pearl, The Swearing Jar,Finding You, Brightburn, which was listed among of the best scores of 2019 in Film Music Magazine, Piney - The Lonesome Pine, starring Simon Pegg and Jonathan Pryce, released on Disney Jr., and We Summon The Darkness directed by Marc Meyers, which won best score at Screamfest LA. 

He scored additional music on many major films including Get Out, Hobbs & Shaw, Guardians of the Galaxy, Deadpool 2, Guardians of the Galaxy Vol. 2, Conan the Barbarian, 300, Watchmen, Super, Sucker Punch, Doomsday, Shark Night 3D.

Upcoming films include Gringa and Southern Gospel.

Orchestrations and conducting
In addition to orchestrating and conducting all the above, Williams also orchestrated and/or conducted the scores to Deadpool 2, The Spy Who Dumped Me, Christopher Robin, Hidden Figures, Guardians of the Galaxy Vol. 2, It, Premium Rush, Green Hornet,  The Way, The Day The Earth Stood Still, Halloween, Slither, and Half Past Dead. Williams has orchestrated for Tyler Bates, Alan Menken, Stephen Schwartz, Robert Duncan, and Bruce Broughton. He conducted for the soundtrack to Valve's Dota 2 and orchestrated Zella Day's album Kicker and "Love is Alive" from Lea Michele's album.

TV
Williams scored the AMC/Shudder Creepshow, the FOX Pilot Richard Lovely, and the Disney Pilot Madison High and additional music on the Cartoon Network animated series Sym-Bionic Titan, ABC's Missing as well as Fox's The Exorcist, Season 2. He orchestrated the TV series Castle, Whispers, Last Resort, Timeless, and S.W.A.T.

Video games
He contributed music for the video game score of Rise of the Argonauts with composer Tyler Bates and contributed additional music on God of War: Ascension. He orchestrated and conducted Transformers: The Game and Army of Two: The 40th Day.

Live spectacle
Williams has also written music and arranged for over 55 live and spectacle shows for Disney, Universal Studios and Seaworld, including Universal's adaptation of "Wicked", Disney's "Aladdin" (Thea Award) at California Adventure, Disney's Tangled – The Musical, Disney's "Snow White", Disney's "Believe", Disney's "Wishes", Disney's "Twice Charmed", Seaworld's "Blue Horizons", Seaworld's "Believe", Disney's "Candlelight Reflection", Disney's "Rhythms of The World", Disney's "Glow in the Park", Disney's "Buzz Lightyears Big Mission", Universal Studio's "Sorciere" and Universal's "Peter Pan" and Napoleon, the West End show. He composed the score for the Georgia Aquarium's "Dolphin Tales". At least 15 shows are currently playing around the world. He has won 4 Thea awards and a Dora Award for the projects "Aladdin – A Disney Spectacular", Universal's "Peter Pan", and "Voice of an Angel" and "Beyond All Boundaries". Timothy arranged the music for the opening of Shanghai Disneyland, which was later turned into "Lunar New Year" for the "World of Color Show" at California Adventure. Williams most recently composed and arranged the Jurassic World Live Tour for Universal Studios.

Awards and nominations
He won Best Original Soundtrack for The Butterfly Circus at the 24 FPS International Film Festival, 8 ASCAP Plus Awards and was nominated for best composer for Red Sky by Motion Picture Sound Editors and best soundtrack by the Hollywood in Music Media Awards. He had won four Thea Awards for his work in themed entertainment.

He has over 30 soundtracks released on labels Sony Records, Milan Records, Lakeshore Records, Disney, EMI Broadway Asia, and First Night Records.

Filmography

Film

Television

Video games

References

Further reading
The Best Scores of 2019
GUARDIANS OF THE GALAXY ORCHESTRATOR TIMOTHY WILLIAMS SCORES ON RED SKY!
WAMG Talks To GUARDIANS OF THE GALAXY Composer Tyler Bates
Acceleration: High-Speed Horror, Fantasy & Science Fiction
From Conan The Barbarian to 300, Watchmen, Rob Zombie and Beyond: Chatting With Film Composer Tyler Bates
Timothy Williams Scoring David Yarovesky’s ‘Brightburn’
Interview: Composer Tim Williams Conducts Superhero Horror in BRIGHTBURN

External links

 
 Napoleon The Musical official website

1966 births
Living people
Dora Mavor Moore Award winners
English film score composers
English male film score composers
Canadian film score composers
English conductors (music)
21st-century British conductors (music)
21st-century British musicians